Lehliu Gară is a small town in the middle of the Bărăgan region in Călărași County, Muntenia, Romania, with a railway station and a national road linking the seaside Constanța and the county capital, Călărași. Also, the new A2 free-way passes nearby, by going to the sea. It officially became a town in 1989, as a result of the Romanian rural systematization program. 

A beautiful network of interconnected lakes makes a fishing day a wild journey. Situated in the middle of the Bărăgan plains, the farmland is almost completely cultivated with cereals. The forests are in every 10 km, wild life being far from extinction.

The town administers three villages: Buzoeni, Răzvani, and Valea Seacă. Buzoeni is situated south-west of Lehliu Gară and it is a remote and isolated village with beautiful landscapes, forests, lakes, hills, and large surfaces cultivated. The average age in Buzoeni is 45 years. The people here usually lead a very quiet life, conserving a lifestyle from the past, with little modern influence.

References

Populated places in Călărași County
Localities in Muntenia
Towns in Romania